Wilmington 10 - U.S.A. 10,000 is a 1979 documentary film directed by Haile Gerima.

Plot 
Wilmington 10—USA 10,000 examined the impact of racism and the short-comings of the criminal justice system by examining the history of the nine black men and one white woman who became known as the "Wilmington Ten."

External links 

1978 films
American documentary films
Documentary films about racism in the United States
Documentary films about law in the United States
Films directed by Haile Gerima
Films set in North Carolina
1970s English-language films
1970s American films